John Stanley Telfer (2 March 1873 – 10 October 1938) was a British auctioneer and philatelist who was added to the Roll of Distinguished Philatelists retrospectively in 1951.

Telfer was a partner, with Frank Hadlow, in the philatelic auctioneers Plumridge & Co.

References

Signatories to the Roll of Distinguished Philatelists
1873 births
1938 deaths
British philatelists
Philatelic auctioneers
British auctioneers